KOI-4878.01 is an exoplanet candidate that orbits the F-type main-sequence star KOI-4878. It is located about 1075 light years (329 parsecs) from Earth. The features of the planet are very similar to that of Earth, and if it is confirmed, it would be one of the most Earth-like planets found. The orbital period of the exoplanet is around 449 Earth days. It is very likely located within the habitable zone of its parent star.

Host star 
Its host star is an F-type main-sequence star that is slightly less massive than the Sun, although it is about 5% larger and has a temperature of about 6031 K. The star is a V magnitude 12.4 star in the constellation Draco. Despite the unknown age of the star, its low metallicity and fairly high space velocity suggest that KOI-4878 is older than the Sun.

Exoplanet detection 
An analysis of Kepler's data from its first to the twelve quarter revealed three possible transit events equally spaced in time. A post-analysis in the Sixteen quarter showed that the events happened with a period of 449 days, they had duration of 12 and half hours, and a transit depth of 94 ppm.

Characteristics

Mass 
KOI-4878.01's mass is somewhere between 0.4 - 3.0 Earth masses; likely about 0.99 Earth masses.

Radius 
The exoplanet has a slightly larger radius than Earth: 1.05 Earth radii.

Temperature 
It has an equilibrium temperature of 256 K (-16.5 °C; 2.3 °F), highly similar to Earth's equilibrium temperature of 255 K (-18 °C; -1 °F), If the atmosphere is similar to Earth's, it would have an average surface temperature of 291 K (17.85 °C; 64.13 °F), slightly higher than Earth's.

Habitability 
The estimated features of the planet are similar to an Earth analog. It completes an orbit around its host star every 449 Earth days. Based on this, KOI-4878.01 should be in the habitable zone of the star.

In literature 
KOI-4878.01 appears in Tras el cielo de Urano, a novel written by Antonio José López Serrano. The convoy from Earth - destined to conquer the exoplanet KOI-4878-01 in the constellation of the Swan - suffers a spectacular accident while orbiting the planet Uranus. Captain Íñigo Cortés, one of the survivors of the expedition, takes the reins of his ship to guide the rest of the colonists, who are not resigned to returning to Earth.

See also 
 Kepler space telescope

References

Kepler objects of interest
Exoplanet candidates